Bobby Valentino is the debut album by American R&B singer Bobby V, known at the time as Bobby Valentino. It was released by Def Jam South Recordings and Disturbing tha Peace on April 26, 2005. The album was primarily produced and executive produced by the duo Tim & Bob and includes the singles "Slow Down", "Tell Me", and "My Angel (Never Leave You)". It debuted at number 3 on the US Billboard 200 with first-week sales of 180,000 copies and has since sold over 708,000 copies nationwide. Bobby Valentino also reached number 34 on the UK Albums Chart and number 74 on the French Albums Chart. It was certified Gold by the Recording Industry Association of America (RIAA) and the British Phonographic Industry (BPI). It served as his first album after the dissolution of his then-group Mista, for whom he released one album on EastWest Records.

Reception 

The album has received mixed reviews from critics. David Jeffries of Allmusic stated that, "Valentino's first full-length has mystical touches in its overall slick and sexy production, touches that help separate the album from the competition in a way the everyday songwriting doesn't." While Steve Horowitz of PopMatters stated that, "Valentino has an undistinguished voice, writes hackneyed lyrics, and his instrumental backing suffers from tedious production values."

Track listing

Personnel 

 Leslie Brathwaite – mixing
 Kevin "KD" Davis – mixing
 Jeff Dixon – executive producer
 Larrance Dopson – producer
 Lamar Edwards – keyboards, producer, engineer
 Michael Eleopoulos – engineer
 William "Poon Daddy" Engram – A&R
 Clare Fischer – string arrangements
 Mark Ford – groomer
 Annan Gause – guitar
 Andy Haller – engineer
 Kalenna Harper – vocals
 Jean-Marie Horvat – mixing
 Jun Ishizeki – engineer
 Tia Johnson – design, creative director
 Tim Kelley – executive producer, bass, acoustic guitar, piano, keyboards, engineer, mixing, fender rhodes, drum programming, instrumentation

 Christian Lantry – photography
 Ludacris – executive producer
 Nonja McKenzie – stylist
 Andrew Nast – engineer
 Brooke Newman – vocals
 Herb Powers – mastering
 Dale "Rambro" Ramsey – engineer
 Bob Robinson – executive producer, guitar (acoustic), guitar, piano, guitar (electric), keyboards, Hammond organ, guitar (12 string), fender rhodes
 Gary Smith – producer, engineer, drum programming
 Sean Tallman – assistant
 Steve "Swiff D" Thornton – producer, engineer
 Bobby Valentino – vocals (background)
 Rondeau "Duke" Williams – producer, engineer, instrumentation
 Chaka Zulu – executive producer

Charts

Weekly charts

Year-end charts

Certifications

Release history

References 

2005 debut albums
Bobby V albums
Def Jam Recordings albums
Albums produced by Tim & Bob
Disturbing tha Peace albums
Albums produced by Mars (record producer)